Chidda railway station is located on the Gawler line.

History 

The name "Chidda" is derived from "the native word for little bird" and the stopping place has also been known as the "Spains Road siding". It is unclear when this station opened, with a mention made in 1936 of "a landing place for passengers who join and alight from the Gawler rail car."

Chidda initially had step down platforms, where a length of 122 metres were provided. In the second half of 1974 they were replaced by the current island platform of the same length. To the west of the station lies the Australian Rail Track Corporation standard gauge line to Crystal Brook.

Services by platform

References

South Australian Railways Working Timetable Book No. 265. Effective 10:00am Sunday, 30 June 1974

Railway stations in Adelaide